A by-election was held in Elginshire and Nairnshire in 1889. The election was won by John Seymour Keay.

Results

References 

1880s elections in Scotland
Elginshire
Politics of Moray
Politics of the county of Nairn
1889 elections in the United Kingdom
By-elections to the Parliament of the United Kingdom in Scottish constituencies